Robert Richard Edge (1872–1918) was an English footballer who played in the Football League for Wolverhampton Wanderers.

References

1872 births
1918 deaths
English footballers
Association football forwards
English Football League players
Wolverhampton Wanderers F.C. players
Loughborough F.C. players